The New Mexico Children, Youth, and Families Department is a state agency of New Mexico, headquartered in the PERA Building in Santa Fe. The department is responsible for managing the state's foster care system and all juvenile correctional facilities.

Leadership 
The department is led by a secretary, appointed by the Governor of New Mexico and subject to confirmation by the New Mexico Senate. The secretary is also a member of the New Mexico Governor's Cabinet. In the administration of Michelle Lujan Grisham, the secretary is Brian Blalock.

Facilities 
Juvenile Justice Services/Facilities (JJS) is the division that operates juvenile correctional facilities.

Facilities include:
 Area 1
 Albuquerque Boys Center
 Albuquerque Girls Reintegration Center
 Camino Nuevo Youth Center (houses female inmates)
 Carlsbad Community Reintegration Center
 Eagle Nest Reintegration Center
 J. Paul Taylor Center
 YDDC (NMGS)

The former New Mexico Boys School opened on October 1, 1909. CYFD closed it in 2005 and was transferred to the New Mexico Corrections Department, now serving as the Springer Correctional Facility.

References

External links
 New Mexico Children, Youth, and Families Department

Child abuse in the United States
Child welfare in the United States
State agencies of New Mexico
State corrections departments of the United States
Juvenile detention centers in the United States